The men's 300 and 600 metre team military rifle, prone was a shooting sports event held as part of the Shooting at the 1920 Summer Olympics programme. It was the third (and last) appearance for military rifle events but the first time that medals were awarded for teams in the prone position. The competition was held on 29 July 1920. 70 shooters from 14 nations competed.

Results

The scores of the five shooters were summed to give a team score. The maximum score was 600.

References

External links
 Official Report
 

Shooting at the 1920 Summer Olympics